Aleksandra Wozniak was the defending champion, but qualified for the 2012 Summer Olympics.

Mallory Burdette won the title, defeating Jessica Pegula 6–3, 6–0 in the final.

Seeds

Draw

Finals

Top half

Bottom half

References 
Main Draw
Qualifying Draw

Odlum Brown Vancouver Open
Vancouver Open